Verdun was an aircraft carrier under development in France in the 1950s which was cancelled before design was completed.

History
With the Clemenceau class carriers soon to enter service, the French Navy launched an effort to build a larger carrier specifically with the nuclear strike role in mind.  Construction of the carrier was considered in 1958 but due to cost the program was cancelled in 1961.

For more than 30 years, France would rely on the Clemenceau class to provide fixed wing aviation.  These two ships were modified in the 1980s to accommodate AN-52 nuclear bombs, taking part of the role of the cancelled Verdun. France built a new carrier finally in the form of the Charles de Gaulle at the end of the 1990s.

See also
 List of aircraft carriers of France

References

Proposed aircraft carriers
Verdun
Verdun